Qi Yunfei (Chinese: 祁云飞; born 5 January 1989 in Hubei) is a Chinese footballer who plays for Wuhan Three Towns in the China League Two.

Club career
In 2008 Qi started his professional footballer career with Henan Jianye in the Chinese Super League. He would eventually make his league debut for Henan on September 7, 2008 in a game against Changsha Ginde.
In January 2012, Qi moved to China League Two club Hubei China-Kyle.

In February 2019, Qi transferred to League Two side Wuhan Three Towns.

Career statistics
Statistics accurate as of match played 11 October 2019.

References

External links
 

1989 births
Living people
Chinese footballers
Footballers from Hubei
Henan Songshan Longmen F.C. players
Xinjiang Tianshan Leopard F.C. players
Chinese Super League players
China League One players
Association football midfielders